Short track speed skating at the 2022 European Youth Olympic Winter Festival was held from 21 to 25 March at Vuokatti Arena in Vuokatti, Finland.

Competition schedule
Sessions that included the event finals are shown in bold.

Medal summary

Medal table

Boys' events

Girls' events

Mixed event

References 

European Youth Olympic Winter Festival
2022 European Youth Olympic Winter Festival events
2022